Yellow Yeiyah, last names also seen as two words "Yei Yah", (born 9 September 1984 in Ondo, Nigeria) is an Olympic swimmer from Nigeria. He swam for Nigeria at the 2008 Olympics.

He first represented Nigeria at international level in the 8th African Swimming Championships held in Dakar, Senegal in September 2006 where he posted a time of 26.04 in the 50 meters butterfly finishing seventh.
He is the current Nigerian National Record Holder in the 50m and 100m Butterfly events.

At the 2007 World Championships in Melbourne he swam 26.05 in the same event, also participating in the 50 and 100 meters freestyle, 100 meters butterfly, 200 meters individual medley as well as being part of the 4x100 medley relay. 
  
British sports journalist and former swimmer James Parrack has described Yeiyah as having "great potential" and has suggested that he specialise to maximise this.

Some of his best times are listed below;
50m Freestyle:  23.86sec
100m Freestyle: 54.17sec
50m Butterfly:  24.46sec NR
100m Butterfly: 57.15sec 
200IM         2:26.31sec

References

1984 births
Living people
Nigerian male swimmers
Swimmers at the 2008 Summer Olympics
Olympic swimmers of Nigeria
African Games silver medalists for Nigeria
African Games medalists in swimming
Competitors at the 2007 All-Africa Games
Swimmers at the 2019 African Games
People from Ondo City